Hugo Broch (born 6 January 1922) is a German Luftwaffe ace during the Second World War who is credited with 81 victories in 324 missions, all on the Eastern Front. He is a recipient of the Knight's Cross of the Iron Cross.

World War II 
Broch is a World War II Luftwaffe pilot. In January 1943 he arrived on the Eastern Front to serve in II. Gruppe of Jagdgeschwader 54 (JG 54—54th Fighter Wing), and claimed his first victory two months later.

Later life
Following World War II, Broch became an employee with Agfa in Leverkusen. He was a prolific autograph signer, and signed many memorabilia items. At age 95 he fulfilled a long held ambition to fly in a Spitfire, the two seat Tr.9 MJ627. On 6 January 2022, he turned 100 years old, making him a centenarian.

Summary of career

Aerial victory claims
According to Spick, Broch was credited with 81 aerial victories claimed in 324 combat missions. All of his victories were recorded over the Eastern Front. Mathews and Foreman, authors of Luftwaffe Aces – Biographies and Victory Claims, researched the German Federal Archives and found records for 81 aerial victory claims, all of which claimed on the Eastern Front.

Victory claims were logged to a map-reference (PQ = Planquadrat), for example "PQ 35 Ost 35371". These sectors were then subdivided into 36 smaller units to give a location area 3 × 4 km in size.

Awards and decorations
 Aviator badge (28 November 1941)
 Front Flying Clasp of the Luftwaffe
 in Bronze (26 March 1943)
 in Silver (10 June 1943)
 in Gold (23 August 1943)
 Iron Cross (1939)
 2nd Class (7 April 1943)
 1st Class (11 August 1943)
 Honor Goblet of the Luftwaffe on 8 November 1943 as Unteroffizier and pilot
 German Cross in Gold on 26 November 1943 as Unteroffizier in the 6./Jagdgeschwader 54
 Knight's Cross of the Iron Cross on 12 March 1945 as Feldwebel and pilot in the 8./Jagdgeschwader 54
 Courland Cuff Title (20 April 1945)

Notes

References

Citations

Bibliography

 
 
 
 
 
 
 
 
 
 
 
 
 
 
 

1922 births
Living people
People from Rheinisch-Bergischer Kreis
People from the Rhine Province
German World War II flying aces
Luftwaffe pilots
Recipients of the Gold German Cross
Recipients of the Knight's Cross of the Iron Cross
Men centenarians
German centenarians
Military personnel from North Rhine-Westphalia